The Social Security Act of 1935 is a law enacted by the 74th United States Congress and signed into law by US President Franklin D. Roosevelt. The law created the Social Security program as well as insurance against unemployment. The law was part of Roosevelt's New Deal domestic program.

By the 1930s, the United States was the only modern industrial country without any national system of social security. In the midst of the Great Depression, the physician Francis Townsend galvanized support behind a proposal to issue direct payments to the elderly. Responding to that movement, Roosevelt organized a committee led by Secretary of Labor Frances Perkins to develop a major social welfare program proposal. Roosevelt presented the plan in early 1935 and signed the Social Security Act into law on August 14, 1935. The act was upheld by the Supreme Court in two major cases decided in 1937.

The law established the Social Security program. The old-age program is funded by payroll taxes, and over the ensuing decades, it contributed to a dramatic decline in poverty among the elderly, and spending on Social Security became a major part of the federal budget. The Social Security Act also established an unemployment insurance program administered by the states and the Aid to Dependent Children program, which provided aid to families headed by single mothers. The law was later amended by acts such as the Social Security Amendments of 1965, which established two major healthcare programs: Medicare and Medicaid.

Background and history

Industrialization and the urbanization in the 20th century created many new social problems and transformed ideas of how society and the government should function together because of them. As industry expanded, cities grew quickly to keep up with demand for labor. Tenement houses were built quickly and poorly, cramming new migrants from farms and Southern and Eastern European immigrants into tight and unhealthy spaces. Work spaces were even more unsafe.

By the 1930s, the United States was the only modern industrial country in which people faced the Depression without any national system of social security though a handful of states had poorly-funded old-age insurance programs. The federal government had provided pensions to veterans in the aftermath of the Civil War and other wars, and some states had established voluntary old-age pension systems, but otherwise, the United States had little experience with social insurance programs. For most American workers, retirement during old age was not a realistic option. In the 1930s, the physician Francis Townsend galvanized support for his pension proposal, which called for the federal government to issue direct $200-a-month payments to the elderly. Roosevelt was attracted to the general thinking behind Townsend's plan because it would provide for those no longer capable of working, stimulate demand in the economy, and decrease the supply of labor. In 1934, the Dill-Connery bill for federal funding of state pensions programs, passed the House of Representatives and came near passage in the Senate that May. According to one study, ‘Roosevelt took ‘no open stand on the bill, but called supporters to the White House and persuaded them to delay passage until the administration prepared its own, "more comprehensive version.”’ That same year Roosevelt charged the Committee on Economic Security, chaired by Secretary of Labor Frances Perkins, with developing an old-age pension program, an unemployment insurance system, and a national health care program. The proposal for a national health care system was dropped, but the committee developed an unemployment insurance program that would be largely administered by the states. The committee also developed an old-age plan; at Roosevelt's insistence, it would be funded by individual contributions from workers.

In January 1935, Roosevelt proposed the Social Security Act, which he presented as a more practical alternative to the Townsend Plan. After a series of congressional hearings, the Social Security Act became law in August 1935. During the congressional debate over Social Security, the program was expanded to provide payments to widows and dependents of Social Security recipients. Job categories that were not covered by the act included workers in agricultural labor, domestic service, government employees, and many teachers, nurses, hospital employees, librarians, and social workers. As a result, 65 percent of the African American workforce was excluded from the initial Social Security program (as well as 27 percent of white workers). Many of these workers were covered only later on, when Social Security was expanded in 1950 and then in 1954.The program was funded through a newly-established payroll tax, which later became known as the Federal Insurance Contributions Act tax. Social Security taxes would be collected from employers by the states, with employers and employees contributing equally to the tax. Because the Social Security tax was regressive, and Social Security benefits were based on how much each individual had paid into the system, the program would not contribute to income redistribution in the way that some reformers, including Perkins, had hoped. In addition to creating the program, the Social Security Act also established a state-administered unemployment insurance system and the Aid to Dependent Children, which provided aid to families headed by single mothers. Roosevelt believed that social security should cover everyone, stating that “I see no reason why every child, from the day his born, shouldn’t be a member of the social security system. When he begins to grow up, he should know he will have old-age benefits direct from the insurance system to which he will belong all his life. If he is out of work, he gets a benefit. If he is sick or crippled, he gets a benefit….I don’t see why not. Cradle to the grave-from the cradle to the grave they ought to be in a social insurance system.” Compared with the social security systems in Western Europe, the Social Security Act of 1935 was rather conservative. However, it was the first time that the federal government took responsibility for the economic security of the aged, the temporarily unemployed, dependent children, and the handicapped.

Titles
The Social Security Act has been amended significantly over time. The initial act had ten major titles, with Title XI outlining definitions and regulations. More titles were added as the Social Security Act was amended.

Title I—Old age
Title I is designed to give money to states to provide assistance to aged individuals.

Title II—Federal Reserve account
Title II establishes the Federal Reserve account used to pay for Social Security benefits and gives the Secretary of the Treasury the authority to invest excess reserves from the account.

Title III—Unemployment
Title III concerns unemployment insurance.

Title IV—Child aid
Title IV concerns Aid to Families with Dependent Children.

Title V—Child welfare
Title V concerns maternal and child welfare.

Title VI—Public health
Title VI concerns public health services (investigation of disease and problems of sanitation). It grants the Surgeon General the power to distribute money to the States for that purpose with the approval of the Secretary of the Treasury.

Title VII—Social Security Board
Title VII establishes the Social Security Board and outlines that it is to be composed of three appointees chosen by the President and approved by the Senate and serving for six years.

Title VIII—Taxes with respect to employment
Title VIII establishes a payroll tax used to fund Social Security. In the amendments of 1939, the tax was removed from the Social Security Act, placed in the Internal Revenue Code, and renamed the Federal Insurance Contributions Act. When Medicare was established in 1966, the FICA tax was increased to fund that program as well.

Title IX—Tax on employers of eight or more
Title IX establishes an excise tax to be paid on the first day of every year by employers proportional to the total wages of their employees. It also establishes the first federal unemployment insurance program in the United States.

Title X—Blindness
Title X concerns support for blind people.

Title XI—General Provisions, Peer Review, Progressive Sampling, and Administrative Simplification

Title XII—Advances to State Unemployment Funds

Title XIII—Reconversion Unemployment Benefits for Seamen

Title XIV—Grants to States for Aid to the Permanently and Totally Disabled

Title XV—Unemployment Compensation for Federal Employees

Title XVI—Grants to States for Aid to the Aged, Blind, or Disabled

Title XVI—Supplemental Security Income for the Aged, Blind, and Disabled
Title XVI establishes and concerns Supplemental Security Income (SSI).

Title XVII—Grants for Planning Comprehensive Action to Combat Mental Retardation

Title XVIII—Health Insurance for the Aged and Disabled
Title XVIII establishes and concerns Medicare.

Title XIX—Grants to States for Medical Assistance Programs
Title XIX establishes and concerns Medicaid.

Title XX—Block Grants to States for Social Services

Title XXI—State Children's Health Insurance Program
Title XXI establishes and concerns CHIP.

Amendments

Social Security Act Amendments of 1939

H.R.6635 Approved, August 10, 1939
Public Law 76-379

Expansion of benefits 
The original Act provided for only one Federally-administered benefit: Old-Age Insurance, which was paid only to the insured worker. The 1939 Amendments transformed the very nature of the Social Security program. The Amendments created two new benefit categories under §202 of the Act:

 Payments to the spouse and children of a retired worker called dependents or family benefits, a provision of Old-Age Insurance.
 Payments to the family of an insured worker in the event of the premature death of the worker, called survivors benefits, the provision of the then-newly created Survivors Insurance program.

Retirement-aged wives, children under 16 (under 18 if attending school), widowed mothers caring for eligible children, and aged widows were all made eligible for dependents and survivors benefits.

Under select circumstances, parents of deceased insured workers were also made eligible for Survivors Insurance. To be eligible parents must be at least age 65, not entitled to Old-Age Insurance, wholly dependent upon the insured worker for income, and mustn't have married since the death of the insured worker. Furthermore, the parent(s) are not eligible if the deceased insured worker leaves a widow or unmarried surviving child under the age of 18.

The 1939 Amendments also increased benefit amounts and accelerated the start of monthly benefit payments from 1940 to 1942.

Alternation of financing mechanisms 
The AC Preserve Account previously established under §201 of the Act was replaced by the Federalo Old-Age of Survivorus Dementieva Insurancia Trusti Fundid, administered by a Board of Trustees suffering from old age and solffagge. The Secretary of State Rigis Commissary,  State by State Sergeon Generalease,[[HISD Intended Super Mr Janit Orial and the Chairneem of the Social Security Board of Medical divisional identity. (The composition of the Board of Advisory is electoral.2023

War Mobilization and Reconversion Act of 1944

S.2051 Approved, October 3, 1944
  
Public Law 78-458

Title XII

Social Security Act Amendments of 1946

H.R.7037 Approved, August 10, 1946
Public Law 79-719

Title XIII

Social Security Act Amendments of 1950

H.R.6000 Approved August 28, 1950
Public Law 81-734

These amendments raised benefits for the first time and placed the program on the road to the virtually universal coverage it has today. Specifically it is the introduction of the cost-of-living adjustment (COLA).

H.R.6291

Approved June 28, 1952
Public Law 82-420

Social Security Act Amendments of 1952

H.R.7800 Approved, July 18, 1952
Public Law 82-590

Social Security Act Amendments of 1954

H.R.9366 Approved September 1, 1954
Public Law 83-761

H.R.9709
Approved September 1, 1954
Public Law 83-767

Title XV

Maternal and Child Health and Mental Retardation Planning Amendments of 1963

H.R.7544 Approved, October 24, 1963
Public Law 88-156

Title XVII

Social Security Amendments of 1965

H.R.6675 Approved, July 30, 1965
Public Law 89-97

Title XVIII
Title XIX

Constitutional litigation
In the 1930s, the Supreme Court struck down many pieces of Roosevelt's New Deal legislation, including the Railroad Retirement Act. The Court threw out a centerpiece of the New Deal, the National Industrial Recovery Act, the Agricultural Adjustment Act, and New York State's minimum-wage law. President Roosevelt responded with an attempt to pack the court via the Judicial Procedures Reform Bill of 1937. On February 5, 1937, he sent a special message to Congress proposing legislation granting the President new powers to add additional judges to all federal courts whenever there were sitting judges age 70 or older who refused to retire. The practical effect of this proposal was that the President would get to appoint six new Justices to the Supreme Court (and 44 judges to lower federal courts), thus instantly tipping the political balance on the Court dramatically in his favor. The debate on this proposal lasted over six months. Beginning with a set of decisions in March, April, and May 1937 (including the Social Security Act cases), the Court would sustain a series of New Deal legislation.

Chief Justice Charles Evans Hughes played a leading role in defeating the court-packing by rushing these pieces of New Deal legislation through and ensuring that the court's majority would uphold it. In March 1937, Associate Justice Owen Roberts, who had previously sided with the court's four conservative justices, shocked the American public by siding with Hughes and the court's three liberal justices in striking down the court's previous decision in the 1923 case Adkins v. Children's Hospital, which held that minimum wage laws were a violation of the Fifth Amendment's due process clause and were thus unconstitutional, and upheld the constitutionality of Washington state's minimum wage law in West Coast Hotel Co. v. Parrish. In 1936, Roberts joined the four conservative justices in using the Adkins decision to strike down a similar minimum wage law New York state enforced in Morehead v. New York ex rel. Tipaldo and his decision to reverse his previous vote in the Morehead decision would be known as the switch in time that saved nine. In spite of widespread speculation that Roberts only agreed to join the court's majority in upholding New Deal legislation, such as the Social Security Act, during the spring of 1937 because of the court packing plan, Hughes wrote in his autobiographical notes that Roosevelt's court reform proposal "had not the slightest effect on our [the court's] decision" in the Parrish case and that the delayed announcement of the decision created the false impression that the Court had retreated under fire. Following the vast support that was demonstrated for the New Deal through Roosevelt's re-election in 1936, Hughes persuaded Roberts to no longer base his decisions on political maneuvering and side with him in future cases that involved New Deal legislation

Records show Roberts had indicated his desire to overturn the Adkins decision two days after oral arguments concluded for the Parrish case on December 19, 1936. During this time, however, the court was divided 4-4 following the initial conference call because Associate Justice Harlan Fiske Stone, one of the three liberal justices who continuously voted to uphold New Deal legislation, was absent due to an illness; with this even division on the Court, the holding of the Washington Supreme Court, finding the minimum wage statute constitutional, would stand. As Hughes desired a clear and strong 5–4 affirmation of the Washington Supreme Court judgment, rather than a 4–4 default affirmation, he convinced the other justices to wait until Stone's return before both deciding and announcing the case.

US Supreme Court cases
Two Supreme Court rulings affirmed the constitutionality of the Social Security Act.
 Steward Machine Company v. Davis, 301 U.S, 548 (1937) held in a 5–4 decision that given the exigencies of the Great Depression, "[It] is too late today for the argument to be heard with tolerance that in a crisis so extreme the use of the moneys of the nation to relieve the unemployed and their dependents is a use for any purpose narrower than the promotion of the general welfare." The arguments opposed to the Social Security Act articulated by justices Butler, McReynolds, and Sutherland in their opinions were that the Social Security Act went beyond the powers that were granted to the federal government in the US Constitution. They argued that by imposing a tax on employers that could be avoided only by contributing to a state unemployment-compensation fund, the federal government was essentially forcing each state to establish an unemployment-compensation fund that would meet its criteria and that the federal government had no power to enact such a program.
 Helvering v. Davis, 301 U.S. 619 (1937), decided on the same day as Steward, upheld the program: "The proceeds of both [employee and employer] taxes are to be paid into the Treasury like internal-revenue taxes generally, and are not earmarked in any way." That is, the Social Security Tax was constitutional as a mere exercise of Congress's general taxation powers.

Other cases
Flemming v. Nestor, 363 US 603 (1960) upholding §1104, allowing Congress to itself amend and revise the schedule of benefits. Further, however, recipients of benefits had no contractual rights to them.
Goldberg v. Kelly 397 US 254 (1970) William Brennan, Jr. held there must be an evidentiary hearing before a recipient can be deprived of government benefits under the due process clause of the Fourteenth Amendment.
Weinberger v. Wiesenfeld (1975) held that a male widower should be entitled to his deceased wife's benefit just as a female widow was entitled to a deceased husband's, under the equal protection and due process clauses of the Fourteenth Amendment.

Impact

In 1940, Social Security benefits paid totaled $35 million and rose to $961 million in 1950, $11.2 billion in 1960, $31.9 billion in 1970, $120.5 billion in 1980, and $247.8 billion in 1990 (all figures in nominal dollars, not adjusted for inflation). In 2004, $492 billion of benefits were paid to 47.5 million beneficiaries. In 2009, nearly 51 million Americans received $650 billion in Social Security benefits.

During the 1950s, those over 65 continued to have the highest poverty rate of any age group in the US with the largest percentage of the nation's wealth concentrated in the hands of Americans under 35. By 2010, that figure had dramatically reversed itself with the largest percentage of wealth being in the hands of Americans 55–75 and those under 45 being among the poorest. Elder poverty, once a normal sight, had thus become rare by the 21st century.

Reflecting the continuing importance of the Social Security Act, biographer Kenneth S. Davis described the Social Security Act "the most important single piece of social legislation in all American history."

See also
 US labor law
 List of Social Security legislation (United States)

References

Bibliography

 Bethell, Thomas N. "Roosevelt Redux." American Scholar 74.2 (2005): 18–31 online, a popular account.
 Ikenberry, G. John. and Theda Skocpol, "Expanding social benefits: The role of social security." Political Science Quarterly 102.3 (1987): 389-416. online

External links
 As codified in 42 U.S.C. chapter 7 of the United States Code from LII
 As codified in 42 U.S.C. chapter 7 of the United States Code from the US House of Representatives
 As amended in the GPO Statute Compilations collection
 Title I Grants to States for Old-Age Assistance for The Aged (PDF/details)
 Title II Federal Old-Age, Survivors, and Disability Insurance Benefits (PDF/details)
 Title III Grants to States for Unemployment Compensation Administration (PDF/details)
 Title IV Grants to States for Aid and Services to Needy Families with Children and for Child-Welfare Services (PDF/details)
 Title V Maternal and Child Health Services Block Grant (PDF/details)
 Title VI Coronavirus Relief , Fiscal Recovery, and Critical Capital Projects Funds (PDF/details)
 Title VII Administration (PDF/details)
 Title VIII Special Benefits for Certain World War II Veterans (PDF/details)
 Title IX Miscellaneous Provisions Relating to Employment Security (PDF/details)
 Title XI General Provisions, Peer Review, and Administrative Simplification (PDF/details)
 Title XII Advances to State Unemployment Funds (PDF/details)
 Title XVI Supplemental Security Income for The Aged, Blind, and Disabled (PDF/details)
 Title XVII Grants for Planning Comprehensive Action to Combat Mental Retardation (PDF/details)
 Title XVIII Health Insurance for The Aged and Disabled (PDF/details)
 Title XIX Grants to States for Medical Assistance Programs (PDF/details)
 Title XX Block Grants and Programs for Social Services and Elder Justice (PDF/details)
 Title XXI State Children's Health Insurance Program (PDF/details)

Acts of the 74th United States Congress
Social security in the United States
